The Golden Globes are awards given each year in Portugal since 1996 by the Golden Globes Academy, made up by professionals of SIC TV and Caras magazine, which award several areas of art and entertainment in the country, with theatre, sports, cinema, fashion and music.

Ceremonies

Categories

Active

Cinema

Fiction

Music

Fashion

Theatre

Humor

Entertainment

Digital

Journalism

Best Newcomer

Award for Merit and Excellence

25 Years Special Award

Inactive

Sports

Extinct

Television

Best Information Presenter
Best Entertainment Presenter
Best Fiction and Comedy Program
Best Entertainment Program
Best Information Program
Best Actor
Best Actress

Radio

Personality of the Year
Best Station

Economy

Best Newcomer
Award for Merit and Excellence

Arts

Best Newcomer
Award for Merit and Excellence

Science

Best Newcomer
Award for Merit and Excellence

Career Award

References

External links
Official website

 
Portuguese awards
1996 establishments in Portugal
Awards established in 1996
Recurring events established in 1996
Annual events in Lisbon